The Black Communities Development Act, 1984, formed part of the apartheid system of racial segregation in South Africa. It provided for the purposeful development of Black communities outside the national states; to amend and consolidate certain laws which apply with reference to such communities; and to provide for matters connected therewith. The act was repealed in 1991.

References

Apartheid laws in South Africa
1984 in South African law
Settlement schemes in South Africa
Repealed South African legislation